Dr M. Manikandan is an Indian politician and a member of the 15th Tamil Nadu Legislative Assembly. He was elected from Ramanathapuram constituency as a candidate of the AIADMK.

Jayalalithaa appointed Manikandan as Minister for Information Technology in May 2016. This was his first cabinet post in the Government of Tamil Nadu..

References 

Year of birth missing (living people)
Living people
Tamil Nadu MLAs 2016–2021
State cabinet ministers of Tamil Nadu
All India Anna Dravida Munnetra Kazhagam politicians
Annamalai University alumni